Diplazontinae is a subfamily of Ichneumonidae.

They are koinobiont endoparasitoids of Syrphidae. Oviposition is into the egg or larva and emergence is from the puparium. Although they are distributed worldwide most species are in the Holarctic region where there are 19 genera.

Diplazontines have 3-toothed mandibles and the first abdominal tergite is  box-like.

References 

 Beirne, B.P., 1941 Beirne, B.P., 1941: British species of Diplazonini with a study of the genital and postgenital abdominal sclerites in the male (Ichneumon.) Transactions of the Royal Entomological Society London 91: 661-712.
 Fitton, M.G., and G.E. Rotheray. 1982. A key to the European genera of diplazontine ichneumon‑flies (Ichneumonidae) with notes on the British Fauna. Systematic Entomology 7:311‑320.

External links 
 Ponent Images (in easy Spanish)

 
Apocrita subfamilies